Voogt is a Dutch surname. In modern Dutch voogd usually is a guardian of a minor, but as a profession had a much wider meaning in the Middle Ages. For example, Floris de Voogd  (c.1228–1258) ruler of Holland and Zeeland when William II of Holland was engaged in Germany. Variant forms of the surname are De Voogt ("the guardian"), (de) Voogd,  (de) Voogdt, and Vooght. People with this or a variant surname include:

Alexander de Voogt (born 1970), Dutch psychologist and board game researcher
Bob de Voogd (born 1988), Dutch field hockey player
Cornelia Claesdr Voogt (1578–?), Dutch mayor's wife portrayed by Frans Hals, sister of Maritge and Willem
Hendrik Voogd (1768–1839), Dutch painter and printmaker active in Italy
Jan de Voogd (1924–2015), Dutch VVD politician
Maritge Claesdr. Voogt (1577–1644), Dutch mayor's wife portrayed by Frans Hals, sister of Cornelia and Willem
Titus De Voogdt (born 1979), Belgian actor
Willem Claesz Vooght (1572–1630), Dutch mayor of Haarlem portrayed by Frans Hals, brother of Cornelia and Maritge

See also
Vogt, German form of the surname
Voigt, another mostly German form

References

Dutch-language surnames
Occupational surnames